Farooq Hamid Naek  (1 July 1947) also spelled Farooq H. Naik, is a Pakistani politician and lawyer, who served as the Chairman Senate, Minister of Law as well as headed the Ministry of Justice in the government led by Prime Minister Yousaf Raza Gillani.

After successfully contesting in the 2008 general elections, Naek won the bid for the law ministry, but ascended to Chairman of the Senate in 2009. Due to cabinet reshuffle by Gillani in 2012, he was again appointed as law minister of the country. He is a high-ranking member of the central committee of the Pakistan Peoples Party, and has been a personal lawyer and legal counselor in the legal cases leveled up against Benazir Bhutto and her spouse Asif Ali Zardari since 1996.

Legal career

Naek was brought up in Karachi, Sindh, Pakistan. After graduating from high school, he was accepted at the Sindh Muslim Law College, where he earned an LLB in law. Later, he went on to attend the post-graduate school of the University of Karachi where he earned an MA in Economics. His political career began in 1971, when he served as Assistant Director at the Directorate of Labour and Social Welfare of the provincial Government of Sindh. He then was a Civil Judge and First Class Magistrate from 1971 to 1975. He was elected General Secretary of Karachi Bar Association during mid-1985-90. He also served as Deputy Attorney General of Pakistan from 1994 to 1996 in the second Benazir Bhutto government.

Naek enrolled as Advocate of local court in 1970, advocate of high court in 1976, and of Supreme Court in 1990. He resigned from the judicial service after serving as civil judge for two years and became an active member of the PPP in the mid-1970s.

Naek was arrested in 1995, after leading a demonstration against the dictatorial rule of General Zia Ul Haq. He was held in Central Prison, Karachi, for about six months along with 10 other lawyers.

Although Naek was associated with the PPP for three decades, he only shot to prominence when he fought the corruption and criminal cases against Benazir Bhutto and Asif Ali Zardari during Pervez Musharraf's rule in and out of Pakistan. It was during these extremely difficult years of Zardari that Naek earned his trust. Before and after becoming the President of Pakistan, Zardari always consulted him on legal matters and other issues.

Naek contested the 2016 Supreme Court Bar Association elections for President, against Rasheed A. Razvi. Naek however lost the election with a large margin.

Political appointments
Naek has been the senator from Sindh since 2003. He was appointed as the Federal Minister for Law and Justice as a result of 2008 Pakistani general election. He was reappointed as the Federal Minister for Law and Justice in April 2012 after his 3-year term as Chairman of Senate.

References

External links
Official Biography of Law minister Farooq H. Naik
Profile of Senator Farooq Naek

|-

|-

Chairmen of the Senate of Pakistan
Law Ministers of Pakistan
Living people
Pakistan People's Party politicians
Pakistani lawyers
University of Karachi alumni
People from Karachi
Sindh Muslim Law College alumni
1947 births
Pakistani senators (14th Parliament)